Benny Williams (born 14 April 1951) is an English former professional footballer who played as a winger.

References

1951 births
Living people
People from Lincoln, England
English footballers
Association football wingers
Lincoln United F.C. players
Grimsby Town F.C. players
Brigg Town F.C. players
Gainsborough Trinity F.C. players
English Football League players